"When I'm with You" is a power ballad by Canadian arena rock band Sheriff. The song was released in January 1983 in Canada as the second single from their self-titled debut album. A top-ten hit in Canada in 1983 (and a minor US hit at the same time), the song later reached number one in the United States in 1989, four years after the band separated in 1985. This song is also notable in that it was one of the few number-one hits not to have a promotional video during the MTV era.

Composition and inspiration
Sheriff's keyboardist Arnold Lanni wrote the song after meeting Valeri Brown and falling in love with her. 'I sat down, put my coffee on the piano, tinkled some ivories, and four minutes later 80 percent of the song was written. On Valentine's Day I played the song for Valerie and said, "I don't have anything, this is all I can give you right now. It's yours." Valeri loved the song; two years later she married me.'

Lanni also played the song to his bandmates in Sheriff. "The band really liked it, so we started playing it live. That was one of the last songs we recorded when we did the record. The producer said, 'Is there anything else?' I said, 'There's this song we play, it's kind of a wimpy song.' So we played it for him and he said 'Yeah, that's kind of nice.'"

Chart performance
"When I'm with You" was originally released as the third single off Sheriff's debut album. The song reached number eight on the RPM chart in the band's native Canada, where it was their biggest hit. In the US, it entered the Billboard Hot 100 on 14 May 1983 and peaked at number 61 four weeks later. Sometime thereafter, disappointed and frustrated by their continued lack of international success, the band broke up.

In November 1988, Brian Philips, Program Director at KDWB in Minneapolis–Saint Paul, and WKTI in Milwaukee began playing the song, and eventually other radio stations nationally followed suit. This encouraged Capitol Records to re-release the song as a single; the song re-entered the Billboard Hot 100 on 26 November 1988. On 4 February 1989, the song reached number one in the United States, making Sheriff the first Canadian band to do so since Bachman-Turner Overdrive reached number one in November 1974 with "You Ain't Seen Nothing Yet".

By that time, former Sheriff members Lanni and bassist Wolf Hassell had formed a duo named Frozen Ghost, and declined to re-form the group. Sheriff's lead vocalist Freddy Curci and guitarist Steve DeMarchi, who had both been working as couriers in the interim, subsequently formed the band Alias and charted the following year with the number-two hit "More Than Words Can Say".

Track listings
7-inch single (1983)
A. "When I'm with You" – 3:51
B. "Crazy Without You" – 3:52

Cassette (1988) and 7-inch single (1989)
A. "When I'm with You" – 3:54
B. "Give Me Rock 'N' Roll" – 3:41

Charts

Weekly charts

Year-end charts

Certifications

References

 Bronson, Fred (2003). The Billboard Book of Number One Hits. .

External links
 Alias Official website

1982 songs
1983 singles
1988 singles
Billboard Hot 100 number-one singles
Cashbox number-one singles
Rock ballads
Sheriff (band) songs
Songs written by Arnold Lanni